St. Mark's Episcopal Church, located at 102 North 9th Street in Haines City, Florida is an historic Carpenter Gothic   church.
On March 17, 1994, it was added to the U.S. National Register of Historic Places.

National Register
St. Mark's Episcopal Church
(added 1994 - Building - #94000159)
102 N. 9th St., Haines City
Historic Significance: 	Event, Architecture/Engineering
Architect, builder, or engineer: 	Unknown
Architectural Style: 	Late Gothic Revival
Area of Significance: 	Exploration/Settlement, Architecture
Period of Significance: 	1875–1899, 1900–1924, 1925–1949
Owner: 	Private
Historic Function: 	Religion
Historic Sub-function: 	Religious Structure
Current Function: 	Religion
Current Sub-function: 	Religious Structure

See also

 National Register of Historic Places listings in Florida

Gallery

References

External links
 
 Polk County listings at National Register of Historic Places
 Florida's Office of Cultural and Historical Programs
 Polk County listings
 St. Mark's Episcopal Church

Churches on the National Register of Historic Places in Florida
Episcopal church buildings in Florida
Carpenter Gothic church buildings in Florida
National Register of Historic Places in Polk County, Florida
Haines City, Florida
Churches in Polk County, Florida
1890 establishments in Florida
Churches completed in 1890